= Old Ruthenian language =

Old Ruthenian language may refer to:

- Old East Slavic, a language used in the 10th to 14th centuries by East Slavs in Kievan Rus', ancestor of Russian and Ruthenian (ancestor of Belarusian, Rusyn, and Ukrainian)
- Ruthenian language, a language used in the 15th to 18th centuries in the Grand Duchy of Lithuania and the Cossack state, ancestor of Belarusian, Rusyn, and Ukrainian
